Reel M Inn is a dive bar and restaurant in Portland, Oregon's Hosford-Abernethy neighborhood, in the United States.

History
The bar closed temporarily in November 2020 during the COVID-19 pandemic. The bar opened for the Super Bowl in 2021, and reopened with limited hours on February 27, 2021.

See also 

 List of dive bars

References

External links

 
 

Dive bars in Portland, Oregon
Hosford-Abernethy, Portland, Oregon
Year of establishment missing